Wysox is an unincorporated community in Bradford County, Pennsylvania, United States. Wysox has a post office with ZIP code 18854.

Demographics 
Wysox had a population of 1,721 and 800 housing units as of the 2010 census. The population is 51% male, 49% female, 96.7% white, 0.3% Black or African American, 0.5% American Indian or Alaska Native, 0.6% Asian, 1.2% two or more races, 0.7% some other race, and 1.4% Hispanic or Latino of any race.

History 
Wysox was founded in 1795. Its name comes from a Native American word meaning "canoe harbor." The Lehigh Valley Railroad used to run through Wysox.

Geography 
Wysox has an area of 23.32 square miles, of which 0.6 square miles are water. Its elevation is 718 feet. Wysox Creek flows through Wysox, then heads south near U.S. Route 6 before merging into the Susquehanna River.

Government 
Wysox's Board of Supervisors currently consists of Chairman William Them, Evan R. Barnes, and Thomas C. Thompson III. Its most recent elections for supervisor were held on November 6, 2019.

Education 
Wysox is in the Towanda Area School District.

Notable people 
 Marguerite St. Leon Loud (1812-1889), poet and writer

References

Unincorporated communities in Bradford County, Pennsylvania
Unincorporated communities in Pennsylvania